Gymnetini is a tribe of fruit and flower chafers in the family Scarabaeidae. There are 34 genera in Gymnetini, mostly New World.

Genera
Allorrhina Burmeister, 1842
Amazula Kraatz, 1882
Amithao J. Thomson, 1878
Argyripa J. Thomson, 1878
Astroscara Schürhoff, 1937
Badelina J. Thomson, 1880
Balsameda J. Thomson, 1880
Blaesia Burmeister, 1842
Chiriquibia Bates, 1889
Clinteria Burmeister, 1842
Clinteroides Schoch, 1898
Cotinis Burmeister, 1842
Desicasta J. Thomson, 1878
Guatemalica van der Poll, 1886
Gymnephoria Ratcliffe, 2019
Gymnetina Casey, 1915
Gymnetis MacLeay, 1819
Hadrosticta Kraatz, 1892
Halffterinetis Morón & Nogueira, 2007
Heterocotinis Martínez, 1948
Hologymnetis Martínez, 1949
Hoplopyga J. Thomson, 1880
Hoplopygothrix Schürhoff, 1933
Howdenypa Arnaud, 1993
Jansonia Schürhoff, 1937
Macrocranius Schürhoff, 1935
Madiana Ratcliffe & Romé, 2019
Marmarina Kirby, 1827
Neocorvicoana Ratcliffe & Micó, 2001
Pseudoclinteria Kraatz, 1882
Stethodesma Bainbridge, 1840
Thaumastopeus Kraatz, 1883
Tiarocera Burmeister, 1842

References

Further reading

External links

 
 

Cetoniinae